Chaitali  is a 1975 Hindi film, directed by veteran director Hrishikesh Mukherjee. The film, released in 1975, was produced by Mrs. Manobina Roy. It is based on the Bengali novel of the same name by Bengali writer Ashapoorna Devi. The music of the film was composed by the duo Laxmikant–Pyarelal. The film has actors Dharmendra, Saira Banu and Pradeep Kumar in lead.

Plot 
Manish, a college professor, takes in Chaitali, a thief, and offers to support her to go straight. Chaitali lies that she is a widow when she isn't even married since she is the daughter of a fugitive and is brought up in a kotha (dancing house) by her protective stepmother. To hide her background, she lies, and that leads to more lies. Manish's brother Avinash is a lawyer practicing from home, and his bedridden wife Prabha accuses Chaitali of stealing a valuable necklace to which Chaitali quickly confesses. Before that, Chaitali, Manish and his mother had visited their family Guru for his guidance where Chaitali had confessed her life story to Manish. Out on the streets, she takes up dancing, which Manish misinterprets as her slap on his generosity. She decides to return money for the stolen necklace with earnings from her dancing but this is interpreted as arrogance and she is thrown out of the house. Soon, Avinash tells the truth to Manish as to why Chaitali confessed to stealing the jewellery.

Cast 
 Dharmendra as Manish
 Saira Banu as Chaitali 
 Abhi Bhattacharya as Chaitali's father
 Shyama as Chaitali's stepmother
 Pradeep Kumar as Avinash
 Bindu as Prabha
 Durga Khote as Manish's mother

Soundtrack

References

External links 
 

1975 films
1970s Hindi-language films
Films directed by Hrishikesh Mukherjee
Films scored by Laxmikant–Pyarelal
Films based on Indian novels